The Battle of Lake Benacus was fought along the banks of Lake Garda in northern Italy, which was known to the Romans as Benacus, in 268 or early 269 AD, between the army under the command of the Roman Emperor Claudius II and the Germanic tribes of the Alamanni and Juthungi.

Background 
Ιn 268, the Alamanni, who had been making incursions into Roman territory since the reign of Marcus Aurelius, had broken through the Roman frontier at the Danube and crossed the Alps. The power struggles in Mediolanum due to Aureolus' revolt, the murder of Emperor Gallienus and the resulting confrontation between Aureolus and Claudius, who had been nominated as emperor by Gallienus on his death bed, forced the Romans to denude the frontier of troops. Having defeated and killed Aureolus in a siege on Mediolanum, Claudius led his army, together with the remnants of Aureolus' force, north to confront the Germans.

The battle
Details of the battle are unknown, but future Emperor Aurelian was present at the battle. After what was described as a decisive victory, Claudius assumed the title Germanicus Maximus. Much of the German force was slaughtered on the field with the remainder retreating beyond the bounds of the Empire.

Aftermath
Claudius returned to Rome after the battle to attend to affairs of state. The Alemanni returned to Italy in 271 and won a victory against Emperor Aurelian at the Battle of Placentia before their ultimate defeat in the Battle of Fano.

References

Lake Benacus
Crisis of the Third Century
Lake Benacus
Lake Benacus
268
Aurelian